The Knossos board game is a unique archaeological object belonging to the Minoan civilization that is preserved in the Archaeological Museum of Heraklion.

It was found by Arthur Evans in the archaeological excavations of Knossos, in an area to the northeast of the palace that has since been called the "corridor of the zatrikion". It is dated to the time of the second palaces (between 1700 and 1500 BC). It is a rectangular piece, made on a wooden base with valuable materials such as ivory, rock crystal, glass paste, gold and silver.

Four cone-shaped ivory pieces were found next to the board, which were probably part of the game.

References

Further reading
 Arthur Evans: "The Palace of Knossos". In: The Annual of the British School at Athens. Vol. 7, 1901, The Royal Gaming Board, pp. 77–82
 Arthur Evans: The Palace of Minos. Vol. 1. Macmillan, London 1921, pp. 463–485
 Robert S. Brumbaugh: "The Knossos Game Board". In: American Journal of Archaeology. Vol. 79, No. 2, 1975, pp. 135–137, JSTOR:503893
 Ulrich Schädler: "Spielen im Labyrinth des Minotaurus?" In: Fachdienst Spiel. Nr. 2/96, 1996, pp. 6–14

Traditional board games
History of board games
Historical tables games
 
Minoan civilization